Luis Spazzapan, (Gradisca d'Isonzo, 18 April 1889 - Turin, 18 February 1958) was a Slovenian painter from the Slovene community in Italy, considered one of the most important postwar Italian exponents of Abstract Art.

He was born as the third of five children to father Gustav Špacapan (Italianized Giustino Spazzapan), a prison guard, and Josipina Mervič (Italianized Giuseppina Mervi).

In 1920 he worked as a teacher of mathematics at the middle schools of Idria, where one of his pupils was the author of the first Slovene comic strip Milko Bambič. Spazzapan left teaching to devote himself entirely to his passion, painting.

In 1923 he participated in Padua in an exhibition of Futurism art movement which he had recently met through the group founded by artists George Carmelich, Sophronius Pocarini, and Mirko Vucetich.

His artistic training was accomplished through several journeys he undertook in his youth in the major art centers, including Munich with Kandinsky, assimilating styles of Art Nouveau, Futurism, Expressionism, and Abstract Art.

In 1928 he moved to Turin, where his meeting the Group of Six of Turin allowed him to create a personal style in his work. In 1936 he was invited to the Venice Biennale, where, in 1954, had a solo show distinguishing himself as a notable artist.

References

Further reading
  Spazzapan : slikarstvo = pittura, Ajdovščina, 2011, .
 Edward R. Tannenbaum (2008) The Fascist Experience: Italian Society and Culture, 1922-1945, ACLS Humanities, 2008,

External links
 http://www.amicigalleriaspazzapan.it/luigi_spazzapan.html
 https://web.archive.org/web/20160416210255/http://www.galleriarosenberg.com/artist/221/spazzapan-luigi

1889 births
1958 deaths
People from Gradisca d'Isonzo
Italian people of Slovene descent
20th-century Italian painters
Italian male painters
20th-century Italian male artists